Bill Dixon in Italy Volume One is an album by American jazz trumpeter Bill Dixon recorded in Milan in 1980 and released on the Italian Soul Note label.

Reception

In his review for AllMusic, Ron Wynn stated "a rare release that showed why he is so admired by musicians and has such a tough time getting recorded. The four songs contain no prominent beats or riffs, catchy hooks, sentimental melodies, or enticing devices... Even the shorter pieces have exacting unison statements and prickly solos. An unfolding, unpredictable musical dialogue."

The authors of The Penguin Guide to Jazz Recordings noted that the album is "very much in the [Cecil] Taylor line," and wrote: "Dixon doesn't feature himself that prominently, preferring to spread much of the higher voicing round the three-trumpet front line."

Track listing
All compositions by Bill Dixon
 "Summer Song One: Morning" - 4:10	
 "Firenze" - 4:45	
 "Summer Song Two: Evening" - 12:45	
 "For Cecil Taylor" - 19:55

Personnel
Bill Dixon - trumpet, piano
Arthur Brooks - trumpet
Stephen Haynes - trumpet
Stephen Horenstein - tenor saxophone, baritone saxophone
Alan Silva - bass
Freddie Waits - drums

References 

1980 albums
Bill Dixon albums
Black Saint/Soul Note albums